German submarine U-470 was a Type VIIC U-boat of Nazi Germany's Kriegsmarine built for service in the Second World War. She was a very short-lived vessel, being commissioned in the months following the turning point of the Atlantic campaign and thus into a time in which many U-boats were being lost. The demise of U-470 was especially notable as she was sunk with two of her sisters in a brief melée in the waters of the Western Approaches.

Design
German Type VIIC submarines were preceded by the shorter Type VIIB submarines. U-470 had a displacement of  when at the surface and  while submerged. She had two shafts and two  propellers.

U-470 was fitted with five  torpedo tubes (four fitted at the bow and one at the stern), fourteen torpedoes, one  SK C/35 naval gun, 220 rounds, and one twin  C/30 anti-aircraft gun. The boat had a complement of between forty-four and sixty.

Service history
Built by the Deutsche Werke shipyards in Kiel, U-470 took a long time to complete, not being ready for initial working-up operations until a year after her construction began. She was given to Oberleutnant zur See Günther-Paul Grave, a highly experienced submarine officer, who led her through her training and mechanical trials and readied the boat for her active career, a difficult six month process.

War Patrol
U-470s only war patrol was an unlucky affair. On 16 October, just 18 days after she left Bergen in Norway, a patrolling aircraft spotted U-470 on the surface. A total of three British Royal Air Force B-24 Liberator bombers from 59 and 120 Squadrons soon swarmed U-470. The captain decided to battle it out on the surface rather than dive, which would have made the submarine an easy target for depth charges.

Fate
Over the course of the next several hours, the Liberators attacked the submarine with nearly 30 depth charges. Eventually damage was so severe that an abandon ship order was given. It came too late, as U-470 quickly sank with 46 hands including the captain. Two survivors were picked up. Initially there was a reported 15 survivors in the water, but many of them did not find buoyancy supports and drowned over the next few hours.

Wolfpacks
U-470 took part in one wolfpack, namely:
 Schlieffen (14 – 16 October 1943)

References

Bibliography

External links

German Type VIIC submarines
World War II submarines of Germany
U-boats sunk by British aircraft
U-boats commissioned in 1943
U-boats sunk in 1943
1942 ships
World War II shipwrecks in the Atlantic Ocean
Ships built in Kiel
U-boats sunk by depth charges
Maritime incidents in October 1943